Gila was a psychedelic rock band from Stuttgart, Germany.

Biography 
The band formed in early 1969 and, with their new/experimental sound, they secured a considerable German fan base.  Gila's original lineup was Daniel Alluno (drums, bongos, tabla, percussion), Fritz Scheyhing (organ, mellotron, percussion, keyboards), Conny Veit (guitars, vocals, tabla, additional keyboards) and Walter Wiederkehr (bass).  In 1971, they recorded their début album Gila - Free Electric Sound and disbanded in 1972.

In 1973, Veit reformed the band with a new lineup, and the same year recorded their second studio album, the krautrock/psychedelic folk Bury My Heart at Wounded Knee. In 1974, they disbanded again.

In 1999, a live album was released, Night Works, which was recorded in 1972 and was originally intended for radio broadcast.

Discography 
 Gila - Free Electric Sound (1971)
 Bury My Heart at Wounded Knee (1973)
 Night Works (1999)
 Free Electric Rock Sessions (2008)

Lineup 
 Conny Veit - guitars, vocals, percussion, keyboards (1969–1972, 1973–1974); flute, bass (1973–1974)
 Daniel Alluno - drums, percussion (1969–1972)
 Fritz Scheyhing - keyboards, percussion (1969–1972)
 Walter Wiederkehr - bass (1969–1972)
 Sabine Merbach - vocals (1973–1974)
 Florian Fricke - keyboards (1973–1974)
 Daniel Fichelscher - drums, percussion, bass (1973–1974)

Notes

External links 
 Gila on Myspace

Krautrock musical groups
German progressive rock groups
Musical groups established in 1969
German psychedelic rock music groups